The protected areas of Georgia cover almost one million acres (4,000 km2) of the state. These areas are managed by different federal and state level authorities and receive varying levels of protection. Some areas are managed as wilderness while others are operated with acceptable commercial exploitation. On the Federal level, Georgia contains 1 Biosphere Reserve, 15 National Park Service Managed Sites, 1 National Forest and 8 Wildlife Refuges. Georgia is home to 63 state parks, 48 of which are state parks and 15 that are National Historic Sites, and many state wildlife preserves, under the supervision of the Georgia Department of Parks and Recreation, a division of the Georgia Department of Natural Resources.

Federal-level protection agencies

Georgia's federally protected areas are managed by agencies within the United States Department of the Interior. The agencies which govern nationally protected places in Georgia are the National Park Service; the U.S. Forest Service; the Bureau of Land Management; and the U.S. Fish and Wildlife Preserve.

Areas managed by the National Park Service
Georgia has many protected areas and historic sites within its borders which fall under the purview of the National Park Service. These areas include
Andersonville National Historic Site in Andersonville
Appalachian National Scenic Trail
Arabia Mountain National Heritage Area
Augusta Canal National Heritage Area
Chattahoochee River National Recreation Area near Atlanta and the
Chickamauga and Chattanooga National Military Park at Fort Oglethorpe.
Cumberland Island National Seashore near Saint Marys
Fort Frederica National Monument on St. Simons Island
Fort Pulaski National Monument in Savannah
Gullah/Geechee Cultural Heritage Corridor
Jimmy Carter National Historic Site near Plains
Kennesaw Mountain National Battlefield Park near Kennesaw
Martin Luther King Jr. National Historical Park in Atlanta
Ocmulgee National Monument at Macon and the
Trail of Tears National Historic Trail.

Although these are occasionally referred to as national parks, these are not true "National Parks" in the strictest sense.  There are 417 units managed by the National Park service (including those 15 in Georgia listed above,) of which 59 are officially designated National Parks as of 2018, none of which are in Georgia.

National Forests
The U.S. Forest Service oversees the Chattahoochee-Oconee National Forest in northern Georgia. The forest is actually two U.S. National Forests combined, the Oconee National Forest and Chattahoochee National Forest. The area of the Chattahoochee-Oconee National Forest is 865,855 acres (3,504 km2), of which the Chattahoochee National Forest comprises 750,502 acres (3,037 km2) and the Oconee National Forest comprises 115,353 acres (467 km2). The county with the largest portion of the forest is Rabun County, Georgia, which has 148,684 acres (602 km2) within its boundaries.

Wildlife Refuges
Several Wildlife Refuges in Georgia are overseen by the U.S. Fish and Wildlife Preserve. The areas under that agencies care are the
Okefenokee National Wildlife Refuge which oversees the Banks Lake National Wildlife Refuge
Piedmont National Wildlife Refuge and Bond Swamp National Wildlife Refuge
the Savannah Coastal Refuges Complex which oversees several different refuges including
Blackbeard Island National Wildlife Refuge
Harris Neck National Wildlife Refuge
Savannah National Wildlife Refuge
Wassaw National Wildlife Refuge
Wolf Island National Wildlife Refuge.
Tybee National Wildlife Refuge
Pinckney Island National Wildlife Refuge

State level protected areas

The Georgia state park system was founded in 1931. The first two areas to be designated as state parks were Indian Springs State Park and Vogel State Park. Other parks in Georgia include, but are not limited to, A.H. Stephens Historic Park in Crawfordville; Bobby Brown State Park in Elberton and Skidaway Island State Park in Savannah. In 2006, over thirteen million people visit Georgia's state parks.

Biosphere Reserve

Four of Georgia's protected areas are part of the Carolinian-South Atlantic Biosphere Reserve. They are:

Blackbeard Island National Wildlife Refuge and Wolf Island National Wildlife Refuge
Cumberland Island National Seashore
Gray's Reef National Marine Sanctuary
Little St. Simon's Island

See also

 Ecology of Georgia (U.S. state)

References